Bodo Peoples' Action Committee was an organization that led the Bodo Movement. This organization was a signatory of the Bodo Accord of 20 February 1993 that ended the Bodo Movement.

Bodoland